The Stade de Franceville is a stadium in Franceville, Gabon. The 22,000 capacity stadium was opened in January 2012, in time for its use in the 2012 African Cup of Nations. The opening game was a friendly between Gabon and Sudan.

References

Football venues in Gabon
Athletics (track and field) venues in Gabon
2012 Africa Cup of Nations
2017 Africa Cup of Nations stadiums
Sports venues completed in 2012